Widdale is a small side dale on the south side of Wensleydale in North Yorkshire, England.
The dale lies to the east of Great Knoutberry Hill (also known as Widdale Fell) and is bounded on the west by Dentdale, south by Sleddale and north by Mossdale.  It is drained by Widdale and Snaizeholme Becks which feed the waters north into the River Ure at Appersett. The name Widdale means 'The Wooded Valley' in Old Norse.

There is a minor road (Lanacar Lane) which connects the B6255 to the A684 road at Appersett, but this is narrow with a  height restriction under Appersett viaduct. Appersett viaduct itself used to carry the railway through Wensleydale and was closed to railway traffic in 1958. Abseilers use the viaduct at present, but the Wensleydale Railway have an ambition to re-open the line all the way to Garsdale.

The southern edge of the dale that carries Snaizeholme Beck is also designated as a red squirrel reserve. Transport is laid on by arrangement from Hawes to drop people off at the edge of the reserve.

Apart from Appersett (which only has 23 dwellings) there are no villages or hamlets in the dale. There are a few homesteads and farms scattered around the dale though.

References 

Yorkshire Dales
Wensleydale